Gilbert is an unincorporated community in Monroe County, Pennsylvania, United States. The population was 459 in the 2000 census. 

The Pohopoco Creek runs southward through Gilbert, then westward through Beltzville Lake to the Lehigh River. Students in the village attend the Pleasant Valley School District.

References

Unincorporated communities in Monroe County, Pennsylvania
Unincorporated communities in Pennsylvania